Forest reproductive material is a part of a tree that can be used for reproduction such as seed, cutting or seedling.  Artificial regeneration, carried out through seeding or planting, typically involves transferring forest reproductive material to a particular site from other locations while natural regeneration relies on genetic material that is already available on the site.

Technical opportunities and challenges to ensure quality and quantity of forest reproductive material can be found in the activities of identification, selection, procurement, propagation, conservation, improvement and sustained production of reproductive material. The use of low quality or poorly adapted forest reproductive material can have very negative impact on the vitality and resilience of a forest.

In Europe, much of the material used for artificial regeneration is produced and transferred within a single country. However, forest reproductive material, usually in the form of seeds or cuttings, is increasingly traded across national borders, especially within the European Union.

Forest reproductive material and climate changes
As a result of climate changes, leading to increasing temperatures, some parts of the current distribution ranges of forest trees are expected to become unsuitable while new areas may become suitable for many species in higher latitudes or altitudes. This will most likely increase the future demand for imported forest reproductive material as forest managers and owners try to identify tree species and provenances that will be able to grow in their land under new climatic conditions. Especially, forest reproductive material with high plasticity will be increasingly useful for this purpose.

References

External links
Use of forest reproductive material. European Forest Genetic Resources Programme
OECD Scheme for the Certification of Forest Reproductive Material. OECD
NordGen. The Nordic Genetic Resource Center
Guide to forest reproductive material. Food and Agriculture Organization

Forests
Plant reproduction